Chevron Rocks is a distinctive rock outcrop at the north end of Retrospect Spur, near the head of Hood Glacier in the Queen Maud Mountains. A New Zealand party climbed Retrospect Spur during the 1959–60 season. They gave the name Chevron Rocks because of their appearance, resembling the stripes worn by non-commissioned officers.

References
 

Rock formations of the Ross Dependency
Dufek Coast